Arrival of Everglow (stylized in all caps) is the debut single album by South Korean girl group Everglow. The album was released digitally on March 18, 2019 and physically on March 19, 2019 by Yuehua Entertainment, and distributed by Genie Music and Stone Music Entertainment. The single album contains three tracks: "Moon", "D+1", and the lead single, "Bon Bon Chocolat".

Background and release
On March 6, 2019, Yuehua Entertainment announced via SNS that Everglow would debut with the single album Arrival of Everglow.

Concept images featuring each of the members were released on March 8, 2019. The album contains three tracks: "Moon", the lead single "Bon Bon Chocolat", and "D+1". The music video teaser for "Bon Bon Chocolat" was released on March 12 and the full music video on March 18.

The choreography for "Bon Bon Chocolat" was made by Lia Kim.

Promotion
Everglow held a live showcase at the Blue Square YES24 Live Hall on March 18, where they performed all three songs on the album.

The group started promoting the lead single "Bon Bon Chocolat" on March 21. They first performed it on Mnet's M Countdown, and later on KBS' Music Bank, MBC's Show! Music Core and SBS' Inkigayo.

Commercial performance
The single "Bon Bon Chocolat" debuted at number 5 on the Billboard World Digital Songs chart and number 10 at KKBox Kpop chart.

Track listing

Charts

Accolades

Release history

References

2019 debut singles
Everglow albums
Korean-language albums
Single albums